Zoltán Melis (born 11 September 1947) is a Hungarian rower who competed in the 1968 Summer Olympics and in the 1972 Summer Olympics.

He was born in Pestszenterzsébet.

In 1968 he was a crew member of the Hungarian boat which won the silver medal in the coxless four event.

Four years later he finished seventh with the Hungarian boat in the eight event.

External links
 profile

1947 births
Living people
Hungarian male rowers
Olympic rowers of Hungary
Rowers at the 1968 Summer Olympics
Rowers at the 1972 Summer Olympics
Olympic silver medalists for Hungary
Olympic medalists in rowing
Medalists at the 1968 Summer Olympics
European Rowing Championships medalists